Attabu 2 is a 2015 Taiwanese docudrama film. It is the final part of a two-part documentary film series about the rise and fall of the Wufeng Lin family (霧峰林家) in Wufeng District, Taiwan. The film is presented with Mandarin Chinese or Taiwanese Hokkien narration, along with subtitles in Chinese and English.

'Attabu' refers to the original name of the Wufeng area under the language of the Taiwanese Plains Aborigines. The first film depicts the Lins sailing from China to Taiwan in 1746 where they would become one of the most powerful clans in Taiwan due to services for the Qing dynasty. Part II continues the story from the First Sino-Japanese War in 1895, when Taiwan officially became a Japanese colony. Under Japanese rule, the Lin's influence waned as the clan members came to support different political ideologies. After Japan's defeat in World War II and Kuomintang's retreat due to the Chinese Civil War, some clan members were then persecuted as traitors or communist sympathizers by the Republic of China administration during the period of White Terror.

See also 
 Wufeng Lin Family Mansion and Garden

References

External links
 
 Official Yahoo movies site
 

2015 films
Films set in Taiwan
Films shot in Taiwan
Taiwanese documentary films
Docudrama films